Apor is a Hungarian name. In older sources, the name is sometimes spelled Opour, Opor or Upor. It can refer to:

Apor (chieftain), a 10th-century Hungarian tribal leader
Apor family, a family of ancient Transylvanian and Hungarian nobility (named Apor von Altorja, Apor von Zalán)
Apor Péc (died 1307), Hungarian baron and landowner